Kalyan Rural Assembly constituency  is one of the 288 Vidhan Sabha (legislative assembly) constituencies of Maharashtra state, western India. This constituency is located in Thane district.

Geographical scope
The constituency comprises parts of Thane taluka that is Ward nos. 6
& 7 of Navi Mumbai Municipal Corporation and Ward nos. 6 & 7 of Thane Municipal Corporation, parts of Kalyan taluka that is ward nos. 31 to 34, 51 to
56, 66, 67 and 69 to 77 of Kalyan Dombivali Municipal Corporation and  Nilje and Hedutane sajas of Kalyan revenue circle.

Members of Legislative Assembly

Election results

Assembly Elections 2009

Assembly Elections 2014

Assembly Elections 2019

References

Assembly constituencies of Thane district
Assembly constituencies of Maharashtra